Franklin Lyle "Frank" Bettger (1888–1981) was an American self-help author and the father of longtime actor Lyle Bettger.

Life and career

Baseball
Bettger played Major League Baseball with the St. Louis Cardinals in 1910 under the name Frank Betcher. He started out his career playing for Johnstown, Pennsylvania in the Tri-State League, making US$175 a month in 1907. While there, he was demoted.  Disappointed, he asked the manager why he was demoted.  The manager responded that he lacked enthusiasm.  Bettger told the manager: "I'm just trying to hide my nervousness." The manager advised: "Try something else. That's not working."

From that moment on, he played with vigorous enthusiasm. Starting with a D League team in 1908 at just US$25 a month, it wasn't long before he proved himself, and he signed with the Connecticut State League for US$185 a month. Two years later, in 1910, he had worked his way up to the majors with St. Louis, but his baseball career was cut short by an arm injury.

Business career
After his brief baseball career, Bettger returned to his native Philadelphia, where he started collecting accounts for a furniture store on a bike. He then started selling life insurance for the Fidelity Mutual Life Insurance Co. of Pennsylvania but was not initially successful, and considered quitting after 10 months. During a moment of reflection, he remembered what his baseball manager told him about his lack of enthusiasm. So he made a commitment to himself to start acting enthusiastically in his insurance presentations.

He also met a successful salesman and took his advice to read the Autobiography of Benjamin Franklin. A light went on in his mind when he realized that Franklin's Socratic method of asking "key" questions might work with selling policies. He tried it, it worked, and Bettger began to perfect his technique with great enthusiasm.

Writer and lecturer
After succeeding in life insurance sales and becoming Top Salesman for 20 years with Fidelity Mutual, he met Dale Carnegie.  Carnegie encouraged Bettger to write his first best-selling books: How I Raised Myself from Failure to Success in Selling and How I Multiplied My Income and Happiness in Selling. How I Raised Myself... was translated into over a dozen languages, including British English, Danish, Dutch, Finnish, French, German Hungarian, Italian, Japanese, Norwegian, Polish, Portuguese, Romanian, Russian, Serbian, Spanish, and Swedish. Bettger also gave a series of lectures to Jaycees organizations nationwide with Dale Carnegie.

Frank Bettger wrote a last book, entitled How I Learned the Secrets of Success in Selling, in 1960. The book focused on his life and  lessons he learned during his short baseball career, and reflected how those lessons learned at an early age helped mold him into the success he became.

Later life
Bettger held insurance policies that would have benefited his wife after he died, but he lived into his 90s.  Consequently, he and his wife outlived their assets. Members of the National Speakers Association contributed to help the couple meet their financial needs. After Frank died, Mrs. Bettger repaid the money from insurance proceeds. The money was then put into a fund dedicated to others in need, thus providing the original funding for the Professional Speakers Benefit Fund (PSBF). The mission of the PSBF is to help other members who may be indigent, face catastrophic health emergencies or losses, or outlive their assets.

In popular culture
In the Mad Men season 6 episode "A Tale of Two Cities" (2013, S06E10), enthusiastic account man Bob Benson is shown listening to a recording of Bettger's first book and later taking actions that earn him increased responsibilities.

The book is also referenced in Whit Stillman's Barcelona as one of the books utilized by one of the main characters, a salesman.

References

External links
Baseball Reference for Frank Bettger's baseball career
Photo of cover of 'How I Raised Myself from Failure to Success in Selling'

1888 births
1981 deaths
American self-help writers
St. Louis Cardinals players
Major League Baseball shortstops
Johnstown Johnnies players
New Haven Blues players
Greenville Spinners players
Montreal Royals players
Galveston Pirates players
Baseball players from Pennsylvania
Burials at West Laurel Hill Cemetery